Anselm of Laon (1117), properly Ansel, was a French theologian and founder of a school of scholars who helped to pioneer biblical hermeneutics.

Biography
Born of very humble parents at Laon before the middle of the 11th century, he is said to have studied under Saint Anselm at Bec, though this is almost certainly incorrect. Other potential teachers of Anselm have been identified, including Bruno of Cologne and Manegold of Lautenbach. By around 1080, he had moved back to his place of birth and was teaching at the cathedral school of Laon, with his brother Ralph. Around 1109, he became dean and chancellor of the cathedral, and in 1115 he was one of Laon's two archdeacons. His school for theology and exegesis rapidly became the most well known in Europe. Famously, in 1113, he expelled Peter Abelard from his school.

The Liber Pancrisi names him, with his brother Ralph, Ivo of Chartres, and William of Champeaux, as one of the four modern masters.

Works 

Anselm's greatest work, an interlinear and marginal gloss on the 'Scriptures', the Glossa ordinaria, now attributed to him and his followers, was one of the great intellectual achievements of the Middle Ages. It has been frequently reprinted. The significance of the gloss, which was most likely assembled after Anselm's death by his students, such as Gilbert de la Porrée, and based on Anselm's teaching, is that it marked a new way of learning — it represented the birth of efforts to present discrete patristic and earlier medieval interpretations of individual verses of Scripture in a readily accessible, easily referenced way. This theme was subsequently adopted and extended by the likes of Hugh of St. Victor, Peter Lombard and later Thomas Aquinas, who gave us 'handbooks' for what we would now call theology.

Other commentaries apparently by Anselm have been ascribed to various writers, principally to Anselm of Canterbury.

The works are collected in Migne. Some of his Sententiae were edited at Milan by G. Lefevre in 1894. The commentary on the Psalms attributed to Haymo of Halberstadt by Migne has also been identified as possibly being the work of Anselm.

References 

11th-century births
1117 deaths
Year of birth unknown
People from Laon
French Christian theologians
Scholastic philosophers
Medieval French theologians
French male writers
12th-century French writers
12th-century Latin writers
12th-century French philosophers
Latin-language writers from France